Nicolás Darío Ortiz (born 4 March 1995) is an Argentine professional footballer who plays as a centre-back for UT Cajamarca.

Career
Ortiz began with Gimnasia y Esgrima of the Argentine Primera División. In January 2016, Ortiz was loaned to Primera B Nacional team Estudiantes. He made his professional debut on 3 April in a win against Atlético Paraná, coming on as a substitute at 1–1. He featured seven more times in 2016, before playing four times in the following campaign of 2016–17. He returned to Gimnasia y Esgrima in January 2017 and appeared on the club's first-team bench on 27 May against Colón but was unused. In May 2018, Ortiz scored on his debut versus Newell's Old Boys; father Darío was caretaker manager.

On 20 June, Primera B Nacional's Quilmes loaned Ortiz; having renewed his contract with Gimnasia y Esgrima until 2020. Nine appearances followed for Quilmes before he went back to his parent club, who loaned him out to Ecuadorian Serie A side Olmedo on 16 January 2019. Like with Gimnasia y Esgrima, Ortiz netted on his bow for Olmedo in a 3–2 defeat to L.D.U. Quito on 9 February. He scored one further time, versus Independiente del Valle, in eighteen games for the Ecuadorian team. In January 2020, Ortiz moved to Peru with UT Cajamarca.

Personal life
Nicolás Ortiz is the son of former professional footballer Darío Ortiz.

Career statistics
.

References

External links

1995 births
Living people
Argentine footballers
Argentine expatriate footballers
Sportspeople from Mendoza Province
Association football defenders
Argentine Primera División players
Primera Nacional players
Ecuadorian Serie A players
Peruvian Primera División players
Club de Gimnasia y Esgrima La Plata footballers
Club Sportivo Estudiantes players
Quilmes Atlético Club footballers
C.D. Olmedo footballers
Universidad Técnica de Cajamarca footballers
Argentine expatriate sportspeople in Ecuador
Argentine expatriate sportspeople in Peru
Expatriate footballers in Ecuador
Expatriate footballers in Peru